Probation (also known as Second Chances) is an American Pre-Code 1932 film directed by Richard Thorpe and starring Clara Kimball Young and Betty Grable. The film was distributed by the Chesterfield Motion Pictures Corporation.

Plot
Ruth (Betty Grable) is a minor who is running with an uptown, older man. Ruth's brother, Nick (John Darrow), is unaware of his kid sister's activities.  Ruth is turned in to the juvenile authorities by the well-meaning Mrs. Humphries (Clara Kimball Young). Nick finds a man in their apartment and proceeds to be arrested for beating up the man, who runs away before Nick is arrested.  Nick is taken to night court and remanded to the custody of the judge's (J. Farrell MacDonald) niece, Janet, for six months as her chauffeur.  Janet (Sally Blane) is the fiancé of Allen (Eddie Phillips), who is coincidentally the man who was beaten up by Nick.

Betty Grable is on the verge of becoming a superstar, in the 1940s.

Cast
Sally Blane as Janet
John Darrow as Nick
J. Farrell MacDonald as Uncle George
Clara Kimball Young as Mrs. Humphries
Eddie Phillips as Allen
David Rollins as Alec
Matty Kemp as Berl
David Durand as David
Betty Grable, as Ruth

References

1932 films
Films directed by Richard Thorpe
1932 drama films
American drama films
American black-and-white films
Chesterfield Pictures films
1930s English-language films
1930s American films